The 1989–90 Kent Football League season was the 24th in the history of the Kent Football League, a football competition in England.

The league was won by Faversham Town, for the fourth time in their history.

League table

The league featured 19 clubs which competed in the previous season, along with one new club:
Tonbridge, relegated from the Southern League

League table

References

External links

1989-90
1989–90 in English football leagues